List of places in Sussex may refer to:

List of places in East Sussex
List of places in West Sussex